The Southeastern Conference Player of the Year is a softball award given to the Southeastern Conference's most outstanding player. The award was first given following the 1997 season, with both pitchers and position players eligible. After the 2002 season, the Southeastern Conference Softball Pitcher of the Year award was created to honor the most outstanding pitcher.

Only two players in history have won the award twice: Iyhia McMichael of Mississippi State (2003, 2004), and Charlotte Morgan of Alabama (2009, 2010).

Winners

Winners by School

References

Awards established in 1997
Player
NCAA Division I softball conference players of the year